Pocklington railway station was a station on the York to Beverley Line that served the town of Pocklington, East Riding of Yorkshire, England. It opened on 4 October 1847 and closed after the last train on 27 November 1965.

The station trainshed, designed by George Townsend Andrews, is a Grade II listed building and now forms the sports hall of Pocklington School.
The front entrance to the building now serves as one of the bays of Pocklington Bus Station which serves the EYMS bus service towards York from Hull, Beverley, Market Weighton, Driffield and Bridlington.

References

External links

 
  Photographs of Pocklington Station
 Pocklington station on navigable 1947 O. S. map
 

Disused railway stations in the East Riding of Yorkshire
Grade II listed buildings in the East Riding of Yorkshire
Former York and North Midland Railway stations
Beeching closures in England
Railway stations in Great Britain opened in 1847
Railway stations in Great Britain closed in 1965
1847 establishments in England
George Townsend Andrews railway stations
1965 disestablishments in England
Pocklington
Grade II listed railway stations